Karbalai Qasemali (also Romanized as Karbalā’ī Qāsem‘alī) is a village in Haparu Rural District, in the Central District of Bagh-e Malek County, Khuzestan Province, Iran. At the 2006 census, its population was 309, in 59 families.

References 

Populated places in Bagh-e Malek County